Dhaka District (Dhaka jela)  is a district in central Bangladesh, and is the densest district in the nation. It is a part of the Dhaka Division. Dhaka, the capital of Bangladesh, and rests on the eastern banks of the Buriganga River which flows from the Turag to the southern part of the district. While Dhaka (city corporation) occupies only about a fifth of the area of Dhaka district, it is the economic, political and cultural centre of the district and the country as a whole. Dhaka District consists with Dhaka, Keraniganj , Nababganj, Dohar, Savar and Dhamrai upazila. Dhaka District is an administrative entity, and like many other cities it does not cover the modern conurbation which is Greater Dhaka, which has spilled into neighbouring districts, nor does the conurbation cover the whole district, as there are rural areas within the district.

Geography 

Dhaka District shares borders with Gazipur and Tangail to the north, Munshiganj and Rajbari to the south, Narayanganj to the east and Manikganj to the west. Main rivers flowing through this district are Padma, Kaliganga, Dhaleshwari, Ichamati, Shitalakshya, Buriganga and numerous smaller rivers including Bangshi, Turag, Balu, Elamjani, Alam, Bherujkha, Ramkrishnadi, Elisamari, Tulsikhali. Major lakes ("beels") include Belai, Saldaher, Labandaher, Churain, Damsharan and Kiranjir Beel. The annual average temperature of the district is maximum 34.5 °C, minimum 11.5 °C; the average annual rainfall 1931mm.

History 

The administrative Dhaka District was first established in 1772, but the existence of urbanised settlements in the area that is now Dhaka city – dates from the 7th century. The present day Savar was the capital of the Sanbagh Kingdom during seventh and eighth century. The city area of Dhaka was ruled by the Buddhist kingdom of Kamarupa and the Pala Empire before passing to the control of the Hindu Sena dynasty in the 9th century. Many believe that the name of the city was derived after the establishment of the Goddess Dhakeshwari's temple by Ballal Sena in the 12th century. Dhaka and its surrounding area was identified as Bengalla around that period. The town itself consisted of a few market centres like Lakshmi Bazar, Shankhari Bazar, Tanti Bazar, Patuatuli, Kumartuli, Bania Nagar and Goal Nagar. After the Sena dynasty, Dhaka was successively ruled by the Turkish and Afghan governors descending from the Delhi Sultanate before the arrival of the Mughals in 1608.

The development of townships and a significant growth in population came as the city was proclaimed the capital of Bengal under Mughal rule in 1608. During Mughal rule the areas currently under Dhaka district was famous for its textile products – especially the Muslin. Mughal subahdar Islam Khan was the first administrator of the city. Khan named the town "Jahangir Nagar" (City of Jahangir) in honour of the Mughal emperor Jahangir, although this name was dropped soon after Jahangir's death. The main expansion of the city took place under Mughal general Shaista Khan. The city then measured , with a population of nearly a million people. The city passed to the control of the British East India Company in 1757 after the Battle of Plassey and eventually to the Crown, British Empire, in 1765 at the Battle of Buxar. The city's population shrank dramatically during this period as the prominence of Kolkata rose, but substantive development and modernisation eventually followed. A modern civic water supply system was introduced in 1874 and electricity supply launched in 1878. The Dhaka Cantonment was established near the city, serving as a base for British and Indian soldiers.

During the abortive Partition of Bengal in 1905, Dhaka was declared to be the capital of the newly established state of Eastern Bengal and Assam, but Bengal was reunited in 1911. The rural areas under present Dhaka district, especially Dohar Upazila were used for the production of indigo.

Following the partition of Bengal in (1947) appending the partition of British India in 1947, Dhaka became the capital of East Bengal as a part of the new Muslim state of Pakistan, while western part of Bengal with a majority Hindu population had become a part of the new and independent India, designated as West Bengal with Calcutta as state capital. Calcutta witnessed communal violence that left thousands of people dead. A large proportion of the city's Hindu population departed for India, while the city received hundreds of thousands of Muslim immigrants from Calcutta, India. The city's population rose dramatically in a very short period of time, which created severe shortages and infrastructural problems. As the centre of regional politics, Dhaka saw an increasing number of political strikes and incidents of violence. The adoption of Urdu as the sole official language of Pakistan led to protest marches involving large crowds. Known as the language movement of 1952, the protests resulted in police firing which killed students who were demonstrating peacefully. Throughout the 1950s and '60s, Dhaka remained a hotbed of political activity, and the demands for autonomy for the Bengali population gradually gained momentum.

The 1970 Bhola cyclone devastated much of the region, killing an estimated 500,000 people. More than half the city of Dhaka was flooded and millions of people marooned. With public anger growing against ethnic discrimination and poor cyclone relief efforts from the central government, Bengali politician Sheikh Mujibur Rahman held a nationalist rally on 7 March 1971 at the Race Course Ground. An estimated one million people attended the gathering, leading to Ziaur Rahman's 26 March declaration of Bangladesh's independence. In response, the Pakistan Army launched Operation Searchlight, which led to the arrests, torture and killing of hundreds of thousands of people, mainly Hindus and Bengali intellectuals.

During the Bangladesh Liberation War the Pakistan army arrested and killed fourteen Muktijoddhas from Dhamrai Bazar. A mass grave created during the war still exists in the western side of Kalampur Bazar. The Pak army also burnt down many houses in Konakhola, Basta, Brahmankirtha, Goalkhali and Khagail Kholamora villages of Keraniganj Upazila.

The fall of Dhaka city to the allied forces led by Jagjit Singh Aurora on 16 December marked the surrender of the Pakistani army. The post-independence period has seen a rapid and massive growth of the city population, attracting migrant workers from rural areas across Bangladesh. A real estate boom followed with urban sprawl and the development of new settlements such as Gulshan, Banani and Motijheel.

Administration 

 Administrator of Zila Parishad: Mr. Md Mahbubur Rahman
 Deputy Commissioner (DC): Md. Shahidul Islam

Subdivisions 
The district does not cover all parts of Greater Dhaka, and Greater Dhaka does not include all parts of the district, which includes rural areas. The district consists of 49 upazilas/thanas, 86 unions, 974 mauzas, 1999 villages, 2 City Corporations, 129 City Wards, 855 City Mahallas, 3 paurashavas, 27 wards and 133 mahallas.

The five upazilas in Dhaka district are:

 Dhamrai Upazila, suburban and rural
 Dohar Upazila, suburban and rural
 Keraniganj Upazila, suburban
 Nawabganj Upazila, suburban and rural
 Savar Upazila, suburban
The municipal area of Dhaka city is under the jurisdiction of the Dhaka North City Corporation and Dhaka South City Corporation; for administrative purposes, the municipal area is divided into 92 wards. Tejgaon Development Circle is merged with the two city corporations.

Demographics 

According to the 2011 Bangladesh census, Dhaka District had a population of 12,043,977, of which 6,555,792 were males and 5,488,185 were females. Rural population was 2,726,934 (22.64%) while urban population was 9,317,043 (77.36%). Dhaka had a literacy rate 70.54% for the population 7 years and above: 73.56% for males and 66.86% for females.

Religion 

Islam is the largest religion in Dhaka district with 94.65% of the population. Hinduism is the second-largest religion with 4.70% of the population. 0.52% of the population were Christians, while Buddhists, once the major religion in the district, were only 0.11% of the population. Although all communities are predominantly urban, a greater percentage of Hindus live in rural areas than other communities. The district of Dhaka has more than 12 000 mosques, 3012 Hindu mandirs, 530 churches, 174 Buddhist temples, three pagodas and a synagogue. For a long time, Islam has been the majority religion in Dhaka, with only 1300 mosques, but more mosques were recently built, and the district is now called the City of Mosques.

Economy 

Dhaka is the commercial heart of Bangladesh. The city has a large middle class population, increasing the market for modern consumer and luxury goods. Many skilled workers are employed in the businesses and industries located in the Dhaka metropolitan area. The city has historically attracted many migrant workers. Hawkers, peddlers, small shops, rickshaws transport, roadside vendors and stalls employ a large segment of the population – rickshaw-drivers alone number as many as 400,000. Half the workforce is employed in household and unorganised labour, while about 800,000 work in the textile industry. Even so, unemployment remains high at 23%. According to CityMayors Statistics, Dhaka's GDP registered at $52 billion in 2005 with an annual growth rate of 6.1%. Its estimated GDP in the year 2020 is $126 billion. The annual per capita income of Dhaka is estimated at $550, although a large segment of the population lives below the poverty line, with many surviving on less than $3 a day.

The main business districts of the city include Motijheel, Panthapath and Gulshan. Bashundhara City is a recently developed economic area that houses many high-tech industries and corporations and a shopping mall that is one of the largest in Southeast Asia, frequented daily by more than 25,000 people. The Export Processing Zone in Dhaka was set up to encourage the export of garments, textiles and other goods. The EPZ is home to 80 factories, which employ mostly women. The Dhaka Stock Exchange is based in the city, as are most of the large companies and banks of Bangladesh, including the Bangladesh Bank, HSBC, Citibank and the Grameen Bank. Urban developments have sparked a widespread construction boom, causing new high-rise buildings and skyscrapers to change the city landscape. Growth has been especially strong in the finance, banking, manufacturing, telecommunications and services sectors, while tourism, hotels and restaurants continue as important elements of the Dhaka economy.

Places of interest 

The historic city of Dhaka is the capital of Bangladesh and lies on the banks of the Buriganga River in the central area of Bangladesh. The old town of Dhaka, south of the city centre, is the site of most of the tourist attractions, including the Lalbagh Fort, the Stat Mosque, and the Ahsan Manzil Palace Museum.

Dhaka was predominantly a city of the Mughals, whose governors and viceroys built several palace, mosques and katrias. Dhaka's finest specimen of this time is the Aurangabad Fort, commonly known as Lalbagh Fort, incomplete but well worth for visit. Also in this area of Dhaka is the spectacular Ahsan Manzil Plance Museum, the Bara Katra, the Cotta Katra and several mosques of note.

The old European quarter lies just north of Dhaka's old town, which houses the presidential place and the National Museum, Dhaka's commercial and diplomatic regions are north-east of this zone. Dhaka Zoo and the Botanical Gardens are a short taxi ride into the suburbs.

Once famed for its Muslin, Dhaka is now renowned for pink pearls and a rich tradition of handicrafts. Shoppers can find lower prices of gold and silver products, and the Dhaka shopping areas of New market and Elephant road and Dhanmondi are good for shopping.

The Botanical garden is a park at Mirpur in Dhaka.It contains various species of plants. It is also a major tourist spot.

Lalbagh Fort 

Built in 1678 by the Viceroy of Bengal, it contains a three-domed mosque, the tomb of Pari Bibi, the reputed daughter of Nawab Shaista Khan, the Audience Hall and the hammam of the Governor. Four Kilometres from the hotel.

Ahsan Manzil Palace Museum 

A majestic place, it was once home to the Nawab of Dhaka, and houses 23 galleries displaying portraits, furniture and household articles.

Jatiyo Smriti Soudho 

Jatiyo Smriti Soudho or National Martyrs' Memorial is a monument in Bangladesh. It is the symbol of the valour and the sacrifice of the martyrs of the Bangladesh Liberation War of 1971, which brought the independence of Bangladesh from Pakistani rule. The monument is located in Savar, about 35 Kilometres north-west of the capital, Dhaka.

Tara Mosque 

A 200-year-old mosque with five domes, with hundreds of twinkling stars on its surface.

Satmasjid 

This mosque in the Mohammadpur area of Dhaka is known for its seven domes.

National Museum 

In the old European quarter of Dhaka, the museum contains many interesting collections, including sculptures and paintings of the Hindu, Buddhist and Muslim periods. One kilometre from the hotel.

Bara Katra 

Bara Katra was built between 1644 and 1646 CE to be the official residence of Mughal prince Shah Shuja, the second son of emperor Shah Jahan. The prince endowed it to his diwan and the builder of the serai, Abul Qasim.

See also 

 Districts of Bangladesh

Notes

References 

 
Districts and regions of Greater Dhaka
Districts of Bangladesh
Districts of Bangladesh established before 1971